Michel Brunet (born December 31, 1970) is a Canadian former ice dancer. With Jennifer Boyce, he is the 1994 Nations Cup bronze medallist and two-time Canadian national silver medallist. With Chantal Lefebvre, he is the 1999 Four Continents silver medallist and four-time Canadian silver medallist. They also competed at the 1998 Winter Olympics. Brunet retired from competition in 1999. He married Brigitte Gauthier, with whom he has two sons, Frédéric and Cédric, born in the early 2000s.

Results

With Richer

With Boyce

With Lefebvre

References

1970 births
Canadian male ice dancers
Olympic figure skaters of Canada
Figure skaters at the 1998 Winter Olympics
Four Continents Figure Skating Championships medalists
Living people
Sportspeople from Gatineau
20th-century Canadian people